Ann Morrish (born 15 June 1928) is a British actress. Her television appearances include regular roles in Compact and The Expert, as well as The House of Eliott, Minder, Softly Softly . She appeared in the 2006 Midsomer Murders episode "Four Funerals and a Wedding" as  Mildred Danvers. In 1996, she played Emily Arundell in  Agatha Christie's Poirot - Dumb Witness . In the autumn season 1964, she acted at the Bristol Old Vic (Colston Hall and Theatre Royal), playing roles in Isabelle, Mary Mary and The Beaux' Stratagem.

Her roles in television plays included the Welsh BAFTA winner written off by Derrick Geer. In addition, she was a presenter on Play School in the late 1960s and she appeared in the BBC children's drama series Break Point (1982), alongside Jeremy Burnham and Stephen Yardley.

External links

1928 births
Living people
BBC television presenters
British television actresses